The 2012 Seguros Bolívar Open Cali was a professional tennis tournament played on clay courts. It was the fifth edition of the tournament which was part of the 2012 ATP Challenger Tour. It took place in Cali, Colombia between 10 and 16 September 2012.

Singles main draw entrants

Seeds

 1 Rankings are as of August 27, 2012.

Other entrants
The following players received wildcards into the singles main draw:
  Facundo Bagnis
  Nicolás Barrientos
  Santiago Giraldo
  Felipe Mantilla

The following players received entry from the qualifying draw:
  Fabiano de Paula
  Juan Sebastián Gómez
  Kevin Kim
  Sebastian Serrano

Champions

Singles

 João Souza def.  Thiago Alves, 6–2, 6–4

Doubles

 Juan Sebastián Cabal /  Robert Farah def.  Marcelo Demoliner /  João Souza, 6–3, 7–6(7–4)

External links
Official Website

Seguros Bolivar Open Cali
Seguros Bolívar Open Cali
2012 in Colombian tennis